The Frederick Gunn School is a private, coeducational, boarding and day prep school for students in grades 9-12 and postgraduate, located in rural Connecticut, United States. The  campus borders the village green of Washington, a small, historic town in Litchfield Hills. Formerly known as The Gunnery and Mr. Gunn's School, it was named for its founder, has no military affiliations and is a non-sectarian school.

The Frederick Gunn School was founded in 1850 by Frederick W. Gunn, a teacher, abolitionist, and father of recreational camping in America, based on his belief that strength of character was the goal of education.

History 
Formerly known as The Gunnery, The Frederick Gunn School was founded by Frederick William Gunn and his wife Abigail in 1850. In 1894 The Ridge School was founded as an affiliated junior school for younger boys. The school offered a classical education typical of Anglican tradition schools of the time but also emphasized athletic opportunities, environmental awareness and moral values. In a less inclusive era, the Gunns' school welcomed girls, international students and African American students.

In the 1920s the school became an all-boys school, enrollment tripled and new buildings were added. During World War II, The Gunnery prepared boys for entering the armed forces. In 1977, The Gunnery returned to its coeducational roots. For several years prior, The Gunnery had a partnership with the nearby all-girls school Wykeham Rise, which has since closed. The first female head was appointed in 1991.

Boarding 
The Frederick Gunn School is a day and boarding school, with 73% (232 boarders, 83 day) of its students residing in one of the 10 dormitories on campus. Students are supported by teachers, coaches, faculty advisors, dorm parents, administrators and student leaders who are designated as Residential Assistants (RAs). In most dormitories, students are grouped by class. Each dormitory consists primarily of single and double student rooms, but also house faculty and their families. There are students from 22 different countries and 22 states in the U.S. Students from the Bahamas, Bahrain, Bermuda, Brazil, Canada, China, Germany, Hong Kong, Hungary, India, Korea, Mexico, the Republic of Moldova, Saudi Arabia, Spain, Sweden, the United Kingdom, Viet Nam and the U.S. Virgin Islands were included in the student body in the 2021–22 academic year.

Athletics

Championships 
1987 – Boys Ice Hockey – WNEPSAC Championship
1988 – Boys Ice Hockey – WNEPSAC Championship
1989 – Boys Soccer – WNEPSAC Division II Championship
1990 – Boys Ice Hockey – WNEPSAC Championship
2002 – Girls Ice Hockey – New England Division II Champions
2004 – Boys Baseball – Western New England Prep Baseball League Champions
2007 – Boys Baseball – Western New England Prep Baseball League Champions
2007 – Girls Lacrosse – New England Class B Co-Champions
2009 – Boys Baseball – Western New England Prep Baseball League Champions
2012 – Girls Field Hockey – New England Class C New England Champions
2013 – Girls Ice Hockey – New England Division II Champions
2013 – Boys Hockey – Edward G. Watkins New Years Tournament Champion
2014 – Girls Ice Hockey – New England Division II Champions
2014 – Boys Crew – National Scholastic Championship Regatta Champions
2015 – Boys Hockey – Edward G. Watkins New Years Tournament Champion
2016 – Boys Hockey – New England Elite Eight Tournament Champion
2016 – Boys Lacrosse – WNESSLA Champions
2016 – Boys Lacrosse – Colonial Tournament Champions
2016 – Boys Football – New England Eight-Player Football Champions
2017 – Boys Hockey – Avon Old Farms Christmas Classic Champions
2018 – Boys Hockey – Avon Old Farms Christmas Classic Champions
2019 – Girls Cross Country NEPSTA DIII Cross Country Champions
2019 – Boys Crew – Beebe Cup Winner
2019 – Boys Crew – Du. Pont Cup Winner
2019 – Boys Crew – Head of the Riverfront Regatta, first place, junior 4+ 
2020 – Boys Hockey – NEPSAC Tournament Piatelli/Simmons (Small) Bracket Champion

Sports offered

Notable alumni 

Gerald Warner Brace, novelist
Nick Collins (2002), member of the Massachusetts Senate
Justin Dunn (2013), Major League Baseball player
Edsel Ford II (1968), director of Ford Motor Company
George Grande (1964), Major League Baseball announcer
P. J. Higgins (2012), Major League Baseball player
Andrew Lack (1964), chairman of NBC News
Dick Lehr (1972), journalist
Kayla Meneghin, professional hockey player
Noemi Neubauerová, professional hockey player
Kristýna Pátková professional hockey player
Sam Posey (1962), professional racing driver
James N. Rosenberg (1895), lawyer
Jesse Lee Soffer (2003), actor
Peter C. Sutton (1968), art historian
Jonathan Tisch (1972), businessman
Steve Tisch (1968), businessman
Sam Walther, professional hockey player
Dick Wolf (1965), television producer

References

External links
 NEPSAC main page
 The Frederick Gunn School website

Washington, Connecticut
Schools in Litchfield County, Connecticut
Private high schools in Connecticut
Preparatory schools in Connecticut
Boarding schools in Connecticut
Educational institutions established in 1850